Elmer R. Gainer (November 22, 1918 – September 29, 1970) was an American professional basketball player. Gainer played college basketball at DePaul University, and was drafted in the 1947 BAA draft by the Baltimore Bullets. He played for the Bullets and Waterloo Hawks in the National Basketball Association (NBA).  He had previously played in the National Basketball League with several teams.

BAA/NBA career statistics

Regular season

References

External links

1918 births
1970 deaths
All-American college men's basketball players
American men's basketball players
Anderson Packers players
Baltimore Bullets (1944–1954) draft picks
Baltimore Bullets (1944–1954) players
Basketball players from Chicago
Centers (basketball)
Chicago American Gears players
DePaul Blue Demons men's basketball players
Fort Wayne Zollner Pistons players
Forwards (basketball)
Sheboygan Red Skins players
Waterloo Hawks players